Caloptilia querci is a moth of the family Gracillariidae. It is known from Japan (Hokkaidō, Honshū, Kyūshū, the Ryukyu Islands) and Korea.

The wingspan is 12-14.2 mm.

The larvae feed on Castanea crenata, Castanopsis cuspidata, Quercus acutissima, Quercus glauca and Quercus mongolica. They mine the leaves of their host plant.

References

querci
Moths of Asia
Moths described in 1982